Demetrida brachinodera is a species of ground beetle in Lebiinae subfamily. It was described by Chaudoir in 1852 and is endemic to Australia.

References

Beetles described in 1852
Beetles of Australia
brachinodera